Ernst Chervet (born 27 September 1940) is a Swiss boxer. He competed in the men's featherweight event at the 1960 Summer Olympics.  Although he did not win a medal, Chervet defeated future professional champion Vicente Saldivar in his first bout of the Rome tournament.

1960 Olympic results
Below is the record of Ernst Chervet, a Swiss featherweight boxer who competed at the 1960 Rome Olympics:

 Round of 32: defeated Vicente Saldivar (Mexico) by decision, 3-2
 Round of 16: defeated Juan Diaz (Chile) by decision, 4-1
 Quarterfinal: lost to Jerzy Adamski (Poland) by decision, 0-5

References

External links
 

1940 births
Living people
Swiss male boxers
Olympic boxers of Switzerland
Boxers at the 1960 Summer Olympics
Sportspeople from Bern
Featherweight boxers